{{Infobox comedian
| name            = Kyle Dunnigan
| image           = 635791491942015169-Kyle-Dunnigan.jpg
| imagesize       = 
| caption         = Dunnigan in 2012
| birth_name      = 
| birth_date      = 
| birth_place     = Weston, Connecticut, U.S.
| nationality     = American
| pseudonym       =
| medium          = Stand up, television, film, radio
| genre           = Comedy
| subject         =
| active          = 1998–present
| influences      = 
| influenced      =
| notable_work    ={{ubl|Reno 911!|Inside Amy Schumer}}
| domesticpartner = 
| relatives       =
| academyawards   =
| website         = 
}}
Kyle Dunnigan (born May 25, 1971) is an American comedian, actor and writer, best known as a writer for Inside Amy Schumer, and for his role as Craig in Reno 911!Career
Dunnigan was a member of the Groundlings Sunday Company and received his BFA in theater from the University of Connecticut.

Dunnigan was a cast member on the 2002 Fox sketch comedy show Cedric the Entertainer Presents. He had a recurring role as Trudy Weigel's serial killer boyfriend, Craig Pullin, from 2004 to 2006 on Comedy Central's Reno 911!, and appeared in the 2007 movie Reno 911!: Miami. He was a cast member on Howie Mandel's 2009 practical joke reality show Howie Do It. He released the album Wait, There's More... in 2009.

He appears in stand-up comedy shows on Comedy Central such as Comedy Central Presents Kyle Dunnigan and Premium Blend, and the talk shows Late Night with Conan O'Brien, Jimmy Kimmel Live!, and The Late Late Show with Craig Ferguson. Dunnigan has co-written with Jordan Allen-Dutton and starred as Craig in a pilot, called Brothers Strong. He headlined Laugh-A-Palooza in August 2012, and promised to "high five" the show's attendees.

In 2013 Kyle released the holiday album Craig's All Star, Rockin' Christmas, You Guys! as his alter-ego character "Craig" and his brother Kurt Pullin. He does his impressions of Donald Trump, Bill Maher and Tim Gunn throughout the skits.  The album features other artists such as singer-songwriter Jesse Thomas, comedian Amy Schumer and actor Kevin Berntson.

Dunnigan was a writer and performer on all four seasons of the 2013-2016 sketch comedy show Inside Amy Schumer, with recurring roles in various skits. He won the Primetime Emmy Award for Outstanding Original Music and Lyrics for co-writing the song "Girl You Don't Need Make Up" from that show in 2015.

Dunnigan, along with Tig Notaro and David Huntsberger, co-hosted the podcast Professor Blastoff on the Earwolf network until July 21, 2015. The podcast ended when co-host Tig decided to leave the show, having earlier given her four-month notice.

He is a regular guest on The Howard Stern Show where he does celebrity impersonations of Caitlyn Jenner, Donald Sterling, Bill Maher, Hashtag Guy, Donald Trump, and Perez Hilton.  Dunnigan has made several appearances on the Adam Carolla Show Podcast where he often does celebrity impersonations of Sylvester Stallone and Joe Biden.

Dunnigan also runs humorous film clip impression sketches on YouTube and Instagram involving "face-swapping" technology in which he's wearing the faces of Andrew Cuomo, Joe Biden, Ray Liotta, Jack Nicholson, Sylvester Stallone, Adam Sandler, and Bill Maher among others. Dunnigan has also appeared on various podcasts such as The Joe Rogan Experience.

In 2022, Dunnigan began working with Ben Avery, a former producer for comedian Tim Dillon. Dunnigan also works with comedians John Bush and Kurt Metzger.

Discography
Albums
Stand-up
2009: Wait, There's More... (CD Baby) CD, Download

Music
2013: Craig's All Star, Rockin' Christmas, You Guys! (CD Baby/Comedy Central Records (2014)) CD, Download

Compilation Appearances
2019: Just for Laughs - Premium, Vol. 30 - Track 10: "Horses (Jfl 2013)" Download

Filmography
Films
2003: Spanish Fly (Skippy)
2005: Patriot Act: A Jeffrey Ross Home Movie (Himself, documentary)
2007: Reno 911!: Miami (Drug Lord's First Hostage)
2015: Trainwreck (Kyle)
2018: Don't Worry, He Won't Get Far on Foot (Ward Doctor)

Shorts
Actor/Writer/Director
2006: Sweet 352007: Craig vs. Wild2010: Lez Chat2010-2013: Craig Vanswers2012: Brothers Strong2013: Carl2013: DEL2014: Cell Phone Party (writer only)
2016: Shit Kids (also producer, composer, editor)
2017: Giving Up (actor only)

Music videos
2009: The Only Thing I'd Change About You (director, writer)
2013: Diva by Sarah Silverman (appearance, backing vocals)
2013: Fuck You, Mistletoe (director, writer, editor)
2013: Behind the Scenes of the Making of "Craig's Christmas Album"Television
Movies
2017: Giving UpStand-up comedy
Writer/Performer
1998: The Jim Breuer Show episode 1.5
1999-2001: Late Night with Conan O'Brien 2 episodes
2004: Jimmy Kimmel Live! episode 3.71
2006: The Late Late Show with Craig Ferguson episode 2.180
2007: Comedy Central Presents episode 11.16
2007: Comedy Colosseum Pilot
2009: Comedy.TV episode 1.14
2014: Just for Laughs: All Access episode: "Sarah Silverman"
2014: Late Night with Seth Meyers episode 2.51

Series
1999: Random Play Pilot
2003: Happy Family episode: "Sara Rebels"
2003: Cedric the Entertainer Presents 6 episodes
2006: Cheap Seats: Without Ron Parker episode: "1985 World's Strongest Man"
2009: Howie Do It 10 episodes
2003-2009: Reno 911! 13 episodes
2011: The Back Room episode: Kyle Dunnigan
2011: In the Flow with Affion Crockett 1 episode
2013: TakePart Live 1 episode, guest
2014: @midnight 1 episode, contestant
2014: Garfunkel and Oates episode: "The Fadeaway"
2015: In-Between episode: "Butts & Boobs"
2013-2016: Inside Amy Schumer 12 episodes actor, 39 episodes writer
2016: One Mississippi episode: "New Contact"
2017: I Love You, America with Sarah Silverman episode 1.9 actor, 10 episodes writer
2018: The Joe Rogan Experience episode 1134
2020: The Joe Rogan Experience episode 1495
2021: The Joe Rogan Experience episode 1707

Podcasts
2021: The Kyle Dunnigan ShowAward shows
2015: 2015 MTV Movie Awards special material writer only
2015: 67th Primetime Creative Arts Emmy Awards'' Winner for Outstanding Original Music and Lyrics

References

External links
 
 
 
 Kyle Dunnigan on Instagram

1971 births
Living people
21st-century American comedians
21st-century American male actors
21st-century American male writers
21st-century American screenwriters
American impressionists (entertainers)
American male comedians
American male television actors
American male television writers
American sketch comedians
American stand-up comedians
American television writers
University of Connecticut alumni